Muzi, or Muji, is a Loloish language spoken by the Phula people of China. It is one of several such languages to go by the name Muji.

References

Loloish languages